Twitter Inc. v. Taamneh (Docket 21–1496) is a pending case of the Supreme Court of the United States on October 3, 2022. The case considers whether Internet service providers are liable for "aiding and abetting" a designated foreign terrorist organization in an "act of international terrorism", on account of recommending such content posted by users, under Section 2333 of the Antiterrorism and Effective Death Penalty Act of 1996.  Along with Gonzalez v. Google LLC, Taamneh is one of two cases where social media companies are accused of aiding and abetting terrorism in violation of the law. The cases were decided together in a ruling by the United States Court of Appeals for the Ninth Circuit, which ruled that Taamneh's case could proceed. The cases challenge the broad liability immunity for hosting and recommending terrorist content that websites have enjoyed.

History
Jordanian citizen Nawras Alassaf died in 2017 during an Islamic State-affiliated attack in Istanbul.

Arguing that the companies failed to control terrorist content on their sites, Alassaf's family sued Twitter, Google and Facebook.

Arguing that the lower court decision improperly expanded the scope of the Anti-Terrorism Act, 18 U.S.C. § 2333, Twitter appealed, arguing that the case warranted review from SCOTUS.

On appeal, the Ninth Circuit did not consider protections under Section 230 in the case, and affirmed the lower court ruling that stated that Twitter, Google and Facebook could be liable.

Supreme Court
The Supreme Court granted certiorari for the case in October 2022, alongside the related case Gonzalez v. Google LLC. Free speech organizations like  the Center for Democracy and Technology, the American Civil Liberties Union, the Electronic Frontier Foundation, and the Knight First Amendment Institute at Columbia University, as well as technology industry trade groups like the Computer & Communications Industry Association, and the US Chamber of Commerce filed amicus briefs in support of the petitioner. The Anti-Defamation League, Senator Chuck Grassley, former US national security officials, and retired American military generals filed amicus briefs in support of the respondent. 

The Court heard oral arguments in Twitter on February 22, 2023. The questions and debate among the Justices and counsels for the parties focused more on the language of the Anti-Terrorism Act, particularly the language of "knowingly providing substantial assistance" to terrorism organisms, and what role Twitter and other services had in regards. Observers to the Court believed that the Justices were not looking for broad changes to the Anti-Terrorism Act or Section 230 that would upend the Internet.

See also 

 Force v. Facebook Inc. 2019

References

United States Supreme Court cases
United States Supreme Court cases of the Roberts Court
Product liability case law
Twitter controversies
2022 in United States case law
Section 230 of the Communications Decency Act
United States Internet case law